Teesri Aankh may refer to:

 Teesri Aankh: The Hidden Camera, a 2006 Bollywood film
 Teesri Aankh (1982 film), a Hindi film